was a town located in Tsukuba District, Ibaraki Prefecture, Japan.

As of 2003, the town had an estimated population of 25,037 and a density of 549.78 persons per km². The total area was 45.54 km².

On March 27, 2006, Ina, along with the village of Yawara (also from Tsukuba District), was merged to create the city of Tsukubamirai.

External links 
Official website of Tsukubamirai 

Dissolved municipalities of Ibaraki Prefecture